The list of Chi Psi brothers includes initiated members of Chi Psi.

Notable alumni

Sports

 Bill Belichick, National Football League Head Coach, New England Patriots
 Buzz Calkins, IRL driver
 Russ Francis, National Football League tight end, New England Patriots and San Francisco 49ers, 3-time Pro-Bowler
 Buckshot Jones, NASCAR driver
 Eric Mangini, National Football League Head Coach, Cleveland Browns
 Waite Hoyt, New York Yankees pitcher, Major League Baseball Hall of Famer
 Hugh McElhenny, NFL running back, Hall of Famer
 Rob Oppenheim, PGA TOUR Professional Golfer
 Vic Seixas, professional tennis player, Davis Cup winner
 Jeff Torborg, Major League Baseball catcher and manager
 Van Earl Wright, sportscaster
 Riley Davis, college basketball writer
 Paul Arthur Sorg, famous horseman of the early 1900s, multi-millionaire, banker, paper mfg.
 Edwin W. Lee, college football player and coach, attorney, state court judge

Government
 Albert II, Prince of Monaco
 Nicholas F. Brady, United States Secretary of the Treasury (Reagan Administration)
 Horatio C. Burchard, United States Congressman from Illinois, 13th Director of the United States Mint, and father of the Consumer Price Index (CPI).
 Arne Carlson, 37th Governor of Minnesota
 William Miller Collier, U.S. Ambassador to Spain, U.S. Ambassador to Chile,  and the President of George Washington University.
 Roy A. Cooper, North Carolina Attorney General and later Governor of North Carolina
 Jim Cooper, United States Congressman from Tennessee
 Orville Freeman, 29th Governor of Minnesota
 Melville Fuller, 8th Chief Justice of the United States
 H. John Heinz III, United States Senator from Pennsylvania
 Richard Helms, 8th Director of the Central Intelligence Agency
 John Newton Hungerford, United States Congressman from New York
 Richard Lamm, Governor of Colorado
 Randolph D. Moss, former United States Assistant Attorney General for the Office of Legal Counsel; established the legal justification for the targeted killing of terrorist leaders in foreign lands.
 John S. Pillsbury, 8th Governor of Minnesota
 William Proxmire, United States Senator from Wisconsin
 Thomas Brackett Reed, 36th and 38th Speaker of the United States House of Representatives
 William Scranton, Governor of Pennsylvania and 38th United States Ambassador to the United Nations
 Thomas Tongue, 75th Associate Justice of the Oregon Supreme Court
 Stansfield Turner, United States Navy Admiral and 12th Director of the Central Intelligence Agency
 Edward S. Walker, Jr., former U.S. Ambassador to Israel, Egypt, and the UAE; Assistant Secretary of State for Near Eastern Affairs.

Literature
 Stephen Ambrose, historian
 Taylor Branch, historian
 Lee Hawkins, author, journalist, musician
 Kenneth Roberts, historical novelist
 Clinton Scollard, a prolific American poet and writer of fiction in the late 1800s and early 1900s.
 Richard Wilbur, poet, two-time recipient of the Pulitzer Prize for Poetry

Industry and finance
 James Ford Bell, founder of General Mills
 Clarence Birdseye, inventor of frozen food products
 Daniel Burke, former President and Chairman of the RT French Company (i.e., "French's Mustard"), founder of the prominent Wall Street (NY) law firm of Burke & Burke, and President of the American Bible Society.
 Robert Hugh Daniel, founder of Daniel International Corporation
 David Gardner, founder of The Motley Fool
 William Henry Gates, Sr., attorney, philanthropist, father of Microsoft founder Bill Gates, author, etc.
 Richard Jenrette, founder of Donaldson, Lufkin & Jenrette
 Herbert Fisk Johnson, Jr. – Former President of S.C. Johnson & Son
 Samuel Curtis Johnson, Jr. – Chairman and Chief Executive Officer of S.C. Johnson & Son from 1967 – 1988.
 Herbert Fisk Johnson III – Current Chairman and Chief Executive Officer of S.C. Johnson & Son
 Edmund C. Lynch, Jr., son to co-founder of financial services firm Merrill Lynch
 Paul Mellon, banker, philanthropist, and thoroughbred racehorse owner
 Charles Edward Merrill, co-founder of financial services firm Merrill Lynch
 Hubertus van der Vaart, Rhodes Scholar, and co-founder/Chairman of SEAF (Small Enterprise Assistance Funds)
 Kemmons Wilson, founder of the Holiday Inn chain of hotels

Entertainment
 Eddie Albert, actor known for his role on Green Acres
 Buddy Ebsen, actor, The Beverly Hillbillies, Barnaby Jones, etc.
 John Gavin, actor, President of the Screen Actors Guild, and also US Ambassador to Mexico
 Allan Jones, movie producer 
 Paul Lieberstein, actor best known for his role on the American version of The Office
 Jerry Mathers, actor best known for his role on Leave It To Beaver
 Steve Miller, Musician, The Steve Miller Band
 Boz Scaggs, musician,
 Fred Weller, movie, TV and stage actor

Military
 Captain Morris Brown, Jr., Medal of Honor recipient
 James Chatham Duane, United States Army Brigadier General, one of Chi Psi's national founders; US Army Corps of Engineers Chief of Engineers from October 1886, to June 1888
 Ross T. Dwyer, United States Marine Corps Major General
 Daniel W. Hand, U.S. Army brigadier general
 Robert E. Kelley, United States Air Force General and former Superintendent of the United States Air Force Academy 
 Henry Martyn Porter, Colonel in the Vermont Infantry and Provost Marshal for the city of New Orleans
 Philip Spencer, one of Chi Psi's national founders, as well as center of the alleged incident of mutiny aboard the USS Somers; hanged at sea without a court-martial.

Other
 Albert S. Bard, lawyer and civic activist, 4th President of Chi Psi
 Mark Bingham, also noteworthy as one of the members of Flight 93 credited with trying to thwart September 11, 2001 terrorist attacks by overpowering the hijackers.
 Temple Hoyne Buell, architect
 Steve Culbertson, President and CEO, Youth Service America
 Elbridge Thomas Gerry, lawyer and reformer, 2nd President of Chi Psi
 Kirk Johnson (scientist), Director National Museum of Natural History at the Smithsonian 
 Charles Luckman, architect of Madison Square Garden, among other projects
 Augie Pabst III, race car driver
 Rev. Joshua Young, D.D. (1823–1904), Unitarian minister of national renown, abolitionist

References

Lists of members of United States student societies
Chi Psi